Yu Yanhong (born August 1, 1976) is a female Chinese softball player who competed in the 2000 and  2008 Summer Olympics .

In the 2000 Olympic softball competition she finished fourth with the Chinese team. She played all eight matches.

References

1976 births
Living people
Chinese softball players
Olympic softball players of China
Softball players at the 2000 Summer Olympics
Softball players at the 2008 Summer Olympics
Sportspeople from Jilin
People from Siping
Asian Games medalists in softball
Softball players at the 1998 Asian Games
Softball players at the 2006 Asian Games
Medalists at the 1998 Asian Games
Medalists at the 2006 Asian Games
Asian Games gold medalists for China
Asian Games bronze medalists for China